The 2003 Nigerian Senate election in Ebonyi State was held on April 12, 2003, to elect members of the Nigerian Senate to represent Ebonyi State. Christopher Nshi representing Ebonyi North, Julius Ucha representing Ebonyi Central and Emmanuel Azu Agboti representing Ebonyi South all won on the platform of the Peoples Democratic Party.

Overview

Summary

Results

Ebonyi North 
The election was won by Christopher Nshi of the Peoples Democratic Party.

Ebonyi Central 
The election was won by Julius Ucha of the Peoples Democratic Party.

Ebonyi South 
The election was won by Emmanuel Azu Agboti of the Peoples Democratic Party.

References 

April 2003 events in Nigeria
Ebonyi State Senate elections
Ebo